Following is a List of Apple II applications including utilities and development tools.

0–9
3D Art Graphics - 3D computer graphics software, a set of 3D computer graphics effects, written by Kazumasa Mitazawa and released in June 1978

A
A2Command - Norton Commander style file manager
ADTPro - telecom
Apple Writer - word processor
AppleWorks - integrated word processor, spreadsheet, and database suite (II & GS)
ASCII Express - telecom

B
Bank Street Writer - word processor

C
CatFur - file transfer / chat software for the APPLE-CAT modem
Cattlecar Galactica - Super Hi-Res Chess in its later, expanded version
Contiki - 8-bit text web browser
Copy II+ - copy and disk utilities
Crossword Magic - Given clues and answers, software automatically arranges the answers into a crossword grid.

D
Dalton Disk Desintegrator - disk archiver
Davex - Unix type shell
Dazzle Draw - bitmap graphics editor
Design Your Own Home - home design (GS)
Disk Muncher - disk copy
Diversi Copy - disk copy (GS)
DOS.MASTER - DOS 3.3 -> ProDOS utility

E
Edisoft - text editor
EasyMailer
EasyWriter

F
Fantavision - vector graphics animation package

G
GEOS - integrated office suite
GNO/ME - Unix type shell (GS)
GraphicEdge - business graphics for AppleWorks spreadsheets (II & GS & Mac)
Great American Probability Machine - first full-screen Apple II animations

L
Lock Smith - copy and disk utilities
Logo - easy educational graphic programming language

M
Magic Window  - one of the most popular Apple II word processors by Artsci
Merlin 8 & 16 - assembler (II & GS)
Micro-DYNAMO - simulation software to build system dynamics models
MouseWrite and MouseWrite II - first mouse based word processor for Apple II (II & GS)

O
Omnis I,II, and III - database/file manager (II & GS)
ORCA - program language suite (II & GS)

P
Point2Point - computer to computer communications program for chat and file transmission (II)
PrintShop - sign, banner, and card maker (II & GS)
ProSel - disk and file utilities (II & GS)
ProTERM - telecom program and text editor
PublishIT - desktop publishing (versions 1-4)

R
Rendezvous - shuttle orbital simulation game

S
ShrinkIt - disk and file compressor and archiver (II & GS)
Spectrum Internet Suite - Internet tools and web browser (GS)
Super Hi-Res Chess - early game aimed at programmers and "power users"
SynthLAB - music composing software

T
TellStar - astronomy
Twilight II - Apple IIGS screensaver (GS)

V
VisiCalc - spreadsheet

W
Word Juggler - word processor
WordPerfect - word processor
WordStar - word processor

Z
Z-Link - telecom
Zardax - word processor
ZBASIC - language - Zedcor Systems

References

Apple II application software